Heathcliff is an American comic strip created by George Gately in 1973, featuring the title character, an orange cat. Now written and drawn by Gately's nephew, Peter Gallagher, it is distributed to over 1,000 newspapers by Creators Syndicate, which took over the comic from McNaught Syndicate in 1988.

The strip is usually presented in single-panel gag frames on weekdays. On Sundays, though, the strip is expanded to multiple panels and titled Sunday with Heathcliff. A regular feature in the Sunday strips is Kitty Korner, where unusual cats in the real world are described.

Heathcliff daily comics can be currently read online on GoComics.

Setting

The strip takes place in a port town called Westfinster. Heathcliff as seen in the strip is predisposed to annoying Mr. Schultz, the manager of the local fish store, called the Elite Fish Market; tipping over, and much more often somersaulting garbage cans into the air, to the annoyance of the local sanitation workers; annoying the milkman to get milk (usually by tricking them into dropping a milk bottle or two); bothering the hard-working sailors who work on the Tuna Fleet; harassing and abusing the dog population; being an informant to the local dog catchers; and pursuing female cats. His girlfriend is a white cat named Sonja, but he has been the target of unrequited affection by another female cat named Crazy Shirley.

Sonja's owner, Herb Jablonski, sees Heathcliff as a nuisance, especially when he brings Sonja home late, but his wife sees Heathcliff as a cat who truly loves Sonja and treats her like a queen, and is often pointing out Heathcliff's gallantry to her oblivious husband. While Sonja is showered with gifts and adoration by Heathcliff, Mrs. Jablonski drops not-so-subtle hints to Herb, who doesn't take them seriously.

Heathcliff is also involved in an occasionally difficult relationship with Mr. Nutmeg, the elderly, moustached owner of the house he lives in. He is, however, loved by the young grandson, Iggy, whom he sees as his friend and owner (although he, too, can be annoyed with him, especially when Heathcliff hides his trombone); and Mrs. Nutmeg, Iggy's grandmother, overindulges him. He is also a friend of Iggy's playmates Willy – Iggy's brainy best friend – and Marcy, a neighborhood girl whom Heathcliff (dressed in baby clothes) has played play doll carriage with. Another character is Muggsy Faber, Westfinster's local bully and his bulldog, Spike, whom Heathcliff usually (and very easily) outwits. Another dog named Chauncey, unlike Spike, is friendly and lovable, and constantly licks Heathcliff's face. An occasional visitor is Heathcliff's father Pops Heathcliff who wears a black and white striped prison uniform.

In recent times, Heathcliff comic strips often have repetitive themes like bubble gum floating, comic strip or celebrity cameos, helmets, robots, an ape called the Garbage Ape, etc., with readers finding it weird or mistakenly interpreting it as an inside joke.

In other media

Comic books
Starting in 1985, Star Comics, an imprint of Marvel Comics, began producing comic books titled Heathcliff. The series ran for 56 issues, changing to the Marvel Comics brand with issue #23. Star Comics added an additional spin-off title in 1987 called Heathcliff's Funhouse (which also switched over to Marvel with issue #6). It was a combination of new material and reprinted stories that first appeared in the original Heathcliff title. In the comics, Heathcliff had a far better relationship with Mr. Nutmeg, and much of his adventures were done with Mr. Nutmeg's grandson. Heathcliff's reputation for adventurism was even noted by the local police, who recruited him for a sting operation against a gang of cats stealing purses, in exchange for them forgiving the fact Heathcliff swiped shellfish, of course. Within the Marvel Comics multiverse, Heathcliff's reality is designated as Earth-85481.
 Heathcliff: The Trickest Cat in the Town (1 issue, Marvel Books)
 Heathcliff the Fish Bandit (1 issue, Marvel Books)
 Heathcliff Goes to Hollywood (1 issue, Marvel Books)
 Heathcliff in Outer Space (1 issue, Marvel Books)
 Heathcliff (56 issues, Star/Marvel)
 Heathcliff Annual (1 issue, Star)
 Heathcliff's Funhouse (10 issues, Star/Marvel)
 Heathcliff Spring Special (1 issue, Marvel UK)
 Star Comics Presents: Heathcliff (1 issue, ashcan)
 Star Comics Magazine (AKA Star Comics Digest) (13 issues, Star)

Animated series

Two animated TV series based on the strip, both simply named Heathcliff, were created. Although Heathcliff does not speak in the comic strip, both animated versions of the character were voiced by Mel Blanc. Heathcliff was one of the last original characters Blanc would voice before his death in 1989.

The first Heathcliff was produced by Ruby-Spears Productions and debuted in 1980. The first season featured segments with Dingbat and the Creeps (Dingbat is the vampire dog (Frank Welker) accompanied by Spare Rib the skeleton and Nobody the jack-o-lantern who were both voiced by Don Messick), which were created by Ruby-Spears for the show, and the second season featured fellow comic strip character Marmaduke (voiced by Paul Winchell). This version is sometimes seen on Boomerang.

In 1984, the second Heathcliff debuted, which was produced by DIC Entertainment. This series featured segments with the Catillac Cats (AKA Cats and Co. by the end credits of the show), which is why this version is sometimes referred to as Heathcliff and the Catillac Cats. In 2005, Shout! Factory released a Volume 1 DVD for the show, featuring the first 24 episodes of the series. Since then, Mill Creek Entertainment has gained the license and released the show on DVD, with a ten-episode best-of compilation entitled King of the Beasts and two volumes that cover Season 1; volume 1 contains 32 episodes, while volume 2 has the remaining 33.

In 2021, the film and TV rights of Heathcliff were acquired by Legendary.

Film
In 1986, Heathcliff: The Movie debuted in theaters. It was an anthology film, which consisted of seven episodes from the 1984 series. The film was released on VHS by Paramount Home Video in 1988.

In the 2007 Argentine-Italian film Noah's Ark, Heathcliff made a cameo along with the other animals by Noah's attention.

Additionally, a CGI animated film has been in development for many years. A trailer called Heathcliff in Bad Kitty was released in 2010, but the movie itself was never released.

As of 2021, Legendary Entertainment has plans to simultaneously develop a TV series and film based on the Heathcliff comics. Gallagher will produce the film alongside Steve Waterman.

Video games
 Heathcliff: Fun with Spelling, published by Datasoft for the Atari 8-bit home computers and Commodore 64 (1984)
 Heathcliff: Frantic Foto, published by Storm City Games, Nintendo DS (2010)
 Heathcliff: The Fast and the Furriest, published by Storm City Games, Nintendo Wii (2010)
 Heathcliff: Spot On, published by Enjoy Gaming, Nintendo DS (DSiWare; 2013)

References

External links
 
 Heathcliff Daily Comic - On GoComics
 Heathcliff at Creators Syndicate
 Heathcliff at Don Markstein's Toonopedia. Archived from the original on December 8, 2015.

Comic strips set in the United States
1973 comics debuts
Fictional cats
Comics characters introduced in 1973
Star Comics titles
 
Gag-a-day comics
Gag cartoon comics
American comics characters
Comics about cats
Comics adapted into television series
Comics adapted into animated series